Reto Pavoni (born January 24, 1968), is a retired Swiss ice hockey goaltender.

Pavoni was born in Bülach, Switzerland, and played for Kloten Flyers in the Swiss National League A.  He also represented the Switzerland men's national ice hockey team on several occasions in the World Junior Championships, World Championships and Olympics.

External links

1968 births
Living people
EV Landshut players
Genève-Servette HC players
HC Fribourg-Gottéron players
EHC Kloten players
Krefeld Pinguine players
Swiss ice hockey goaltenders
Olympic ice hockey players of Switzerland
Ice hockey players at the 1992 Winter Olympics
People from Bülach
Sportspeople from the canton of Zürich